is a Japanese politician serving in the House of Representatives in the Diet (national legislature) as a member of the Liberal Democratic Party and Minister of Reconstruction. A native of Toyoura District, Yamaguchi and graduate of Hosei University he was elected for the first time in 1996 after serving in local assemblies. Tanaka was elected seven times in Kanagawa, prefecture 10th district
Tanaka is general director of the Liberal Democratic Party International bureau in 2015.

Overview 

Tanaka was elected to the Kawasaki Municipal Assembly, since then re-elected once, 1983. Then he was elected to the Kanagawa Prefectural Assembly, 1991.
He was elected to the House of Representatives for the first time in the 1996 general election. 
He was Parliamentary Secretary of the Ministry of Land, Infrastructure and Transport in the Cabinet of Prime Minister Junichirō Koizumi in 2001. He was Parliamentary Secretary for Finance in the Cabinet of Prime Minister Junichirō Koizumi in 2002.
He was Parliamentary Secretary for Foreign Affairs in the Cabinet of Prime Minister Junichirō Koizumi in 2003.

He was Vice Minister of Finance the Cabinet of Prime Minister Shinzō Abe on 26 September 2006. Tnaka was Senior Vice Minister of Environment the Cabinet of Prime Minister Shinzō Abe on 26 December 2012.

He took office as Minister of Reconstruction since 9 September 2019.

References

External links
  Official website in Japanese.

Living people
1949 births
People from Shimonoseki
Liberal Democratic Party (Japan) politicians
Members of the House of Representatives (Japan)
Hosei University alumni
21st-century Japanese politicians